Thulite (sometimes called rosaline) is a translucent, crystalline or massive pink manganese-bearing variety of the mineral zoisite. Manganese substitutes for calcium in the structure with up to two percent Mn2+. Thulite is often mottled with white calcite and occurs as veins and fracture fillings transecting many types of rock. In mineralogical literature, thulite may sometimes refer to any pink zoisite.  Clinothulite is the manganese bearing variety of monoclinic clinozoisite.

Thulite was first discovered at a place called Sauland in Telemark, Norway in 1820. It is named after the mythical island of Thule in the belief that the island is Scandinavia. Thulite is used as a gemstone and carving material in the manufacture of jewelry and ornamental objects.

Thulite is also found in the Austrian Tyrol and in Mitchell County, North Carolina. A new, more recent find of a small quantity of thulite was discovered near Riverside in Okanogan County, Washington, US  and in Snillfjord i Trøndelag, Norway during tunnel constructions in December 2018. Thulite is also found in New Zealand in the Otago region of the South Island.

References

Gemstones
Sorosilicates
Manganese(II) minerals
Minerals in space group 62